FK Dečić (Montenegrin Cyrillic: ФК Дечић) is a Montenegrin football club from Tuzi. Currently, the club is member of the Montenegrin First League. It is a part of Dečić sport society.

History
Founded during 1926, it's named after Dečić hill. The team played only non-league matches in period before World War II. First official competition in which participated FK Dečić lowest-tier Fourth League - Central in which they participated until the beginning of the seventies. In that era, big local rivalry between FK Dečić and neighbouring FK Zeta was born.
First significant success during the SFR Yugoslavia era was title of Fourth League champion on season 1972–73, which meant promotion of FK Dečić to the third-tier competition Montenegrin Republic League.
Most of their seasons until the end of century, FK Dečić spent in the Republic League, with few relegations to the Fourth League. Best successes at that time, Dečić made at seasons 1988–89, with third place in the Montenegrin Republic League and 1989–90, when they were runners-up. 
Greatest result in that time, Dečić made at season 2003–04. After hard struggle with FK Lovćen, the team from Tuzi won the champions title in the Republic League and secured historical, first promotion to the Yugoslav Second League. FK Dečić debuted in the Second League in the 2004-05 season, and finished high, in third position. Next year, Dečić finished in seventh place.
After Montenegrin independence, FK Dečić became a member of the Montenegrin First League (season 2006-07), which was historical result of the team from Tuzi. Dečić played its first game in the First League on 12 August 2006, against FK Mogren in Budva (1-1). A week later, FK Dečić played its first top-division on renovated stadium in Tuzi against Montenegrin strongest side FK Budućnost (0-3) in front of 3,000 spectators. That was a record attendance on FK Dečić home games.
Until 2012, FK Dečić spent six consecutive seasons in the First League. But after the 2011–12 season, the team was relegated to the Montenegrin Second League.
Next seasons, the club spent with often promotions and relegations between the First and Second League, with final return to top-division at the 2015-16 season, after great result in the First League playoff matches against FK Mogren (2-1; 5–0). During the next two seasons, with head-coaches Viktor Trenevski and Edis Mulalić, FK Dečić made significant results in the First League, finished at the upper half of table. Era of good results finished after the 2017-18 season, as FK Dečić finished at the bottom and was relegated to the Second League. 
Two years later, the team from Tuzi, as a champion of 2019-20 Montenegrin Second League, made another comeback to the top tier. They would start the 2020–21 Montenegrin First League with a promising 2–0 win at home against the former Montenegrin First League champions FK Budućnost. That season would become the most successful start to a season in the clubs history.

Talent producing
The best known player to come up through the club is Refik Šabanadžović who later went on to a notable career with Željezničar and Red Star Belgrade and won the UEFA Champions League. Other notable players are Ardian Đokaj and Sanibal Orahovac.

First League Record

For the first time, Dečić played in the Montenegrin First League in the 2006–07 season. Below is a list of FK Dečić scores in the First League by every single season.

Honours and achievements

 Montenegrin Cup
Runners-up (2): 2020–21, 2021–22
 Montenegrin Second League
Winners (2): 2012–13, 2019–20
Runners-up (1): 2014–15
 Montenegrin Republic League
Winners (1): 2003–04
 Montenegrin Fourth League
Winners (6): 1971–72, 1975–76, 1982–83, 1986–87, 2001–02, 2002–03

European record

As of match played 14 July 2022

Notes
 QR: Qualifying round

Players

Current squad

Players with multiple nationalities

   Kristijan Vulaj

   Jonathan Drešaj
   Jovan Nikolić
   Mladen Zeljković
   Ronaldo Rudović

Notable players
For the list of former and current players with Wikipedia article, please see :Category:FK Dečić players.
Below is the list of FK Dečić players which made international careers or played for national teams of their countries.
 Refik Šabanadžović
 Ardian Đokaj
 Sanibal Orahovac

Historical list of coaches

 Vojo Pejović (Jul 2006 - Sep 2006)
 Mladen Vukičević (18 Sep 2006 – Jun 2007)
 Bozidar Vuković (Jul 2007 - Jun 2009)
 Ivan Čančarević (Jul 2009 – Dec 2009)
 Slaviša Bozičić (5 Jan 2010 – Jun 2010)
 Mladen Vukičević (Jul 2010 – Sep 2011)
 Bozidar Vuković (22 Sep 2011 - Jun 2012)
 Fuad Krkanović (Jul 2012 – Jun 2013)
 Radim Nečas (Jul 2013 – Mar 2014)
 Pavel Malura (6 Mar 2014 – Apr 2014)
 Fuad Krkanović (22 Apr 2014 – Jun 2015)
 Viktor Trenevski (Jul 2015 - Oct 2015)
 Fuad Krkanović (28 Oct 2015 – Jun 2016)
 Milija Savović (Jul 2016 – Sep 2016)
 Edis Mulalić (Sep 2016 - Mar 2017)
 Fuad Krkanović (Mar 2017)
 Edis Mulalić (Mar 2017 - May 2017)
 Fuad Krkanović (May 2017 – Jun 2017)
 Mirko Marić (Jul 2017 – Dec 2017)
 Viktor Trenevski (Jan 2018 - May 2018)
 Fuad Krkanović (May 2018 – Jul 2020)
 Edis Mulalić (Jul 2020 – Sep 2021)
 Miljan Radović (Sep 2021 – Apr 2022)
 Vladimir Janković (Apr 2022 – Sep 2022)
 Derviš Hadžiosmanović (Sep 2022 – )

Sponsors
Official sponsor: NLB banka
Official kit supplier: Legea

Stadium

FK Dečić home ground is Stadion Tuško Polje, built during 2006. The stadium was renovated several times, so today it has a capacity of 2,000 seats on two stands. Next phase of works will be expanding of the western stand and after that, capacity of the stadium will be 3,000 seats. In addition to the main field is an auxiliary field with artificial grass that is used for competitions in the junior categories.

See also
Tuzi
Podgorica
Montenegrin First League
Montenegrin clubs in Yugoslav football competitions (1946–2006)

References

External links
 Profile by Weltfussballarchiv 
 Football Association of Montenegro – Official Site
 RSSSF Montenegro First League

 
Association football clubs established in 1926
Football clubs in Montenegro
Football clubs in Podgorica
1926 establishments in Montenegro